In mathematics, the Witten zeta function, is a function associated to a root system that encodes the degrees of the irreducible representations of the corresponding Lie group. These zeta functions were introduced by Don Zagier who named them after Edward Witten's study of their special values (among other things). Note that in, Witten zeta functions do not appear as explicit objects in their own right.

Definition
If  is a compact semisimple Lie group, the associated Witten zeta function is (the meromorphic continuation of) the series  

Examples 

 , the Riemann zeta function.

Abscissa of convergence 
This is a theorem due to Alex Lubotzky and Michael Larsen. A new proof is given by Jokke Häsä and Alexander Stasinski 
 
which yields a more general result, namely it gives an explicit value (in terms of simple combinatorics) of the abscissa of convergence of any "Mellin zeta function" of the form

where  is a product of linear polynomials with non-negative real coefficients.

Singularities and values of the Witten zeta function associated to SU(3) 

At , we have  and 

Let  be a positive integer. We have 

References

Zeta and L-functions